Zimbabwe Premier Soccer League is the top professional division of the Zimbabwe Football Association. It was founded in 1980, as a successor to the 1962 formed Rhodesia National Football League. It is currently sponsored by Delta Beverages under the Castle Lager brand and hence is known as Castle Lager Premier Soccer League. The current sponsorship deal runs from 2011 and is worth $3.6 million.

The league consists of 18 teams listed below, that play a total of 34 matches. The season runs from April to November. Most matches are played during weekends on Saturdays and Sundays. Postponed matches are played midweek. At the end of the season four teams are relegated into the lower division and an equal number promoted.

The end of season winner qualifies for the CAF Champions League, while the Cup of Zimbabwe winners gains entry into the CAF Confederation Cup. The current champions are CAPS United who won the 2016 Zimbabwe Premier Soccer League. For a recent season, see 2019 Zimbabwe Premier Soccer League.

Overview

2021-22 season clubs

Previous winners

Top goalscorers

Sponsorship
From 2011, the Premier Soccer League has had title sponsorship rights sold to Delta Beverages, who sponsor the league under their Castle Lager brand. The deal runs until 2018. Originally a lower income level, in 2014 Delta Beverages upped their sponsorship to $3.6 million.

Media coverage
Before, the Premier Soccer League has a television deal with SuperSport who broadcast matches regularly across Africa.

In 2021, the league signed a deal with ZTN (Zimpapers Television Network) to air live Castle Lager PSL and Chibuku Super Cup matches. ZTN Prime, their newest free-to-air television network will air the matches and their social media platforms as well.

On Youtube and Facebook, The May 15, 2022's match of Highlanders F.C. versus Dynamos Harare F.C. garnered 50,000 viewers as the highest-viewed PSL match on the social media platforms.

See also
Soccer Star of the Year

References

External links
fifa.com; League overview
RSSSF competition history

 
Football leagues in Zimbabwe
Zimbabwe
Sports leagues established in 1980
1980 establishments in Zimbabwe